Arsenije Loma (1768–1815) was a Serbian voivode (military commander) in the First and Second Serbian Uprising of the Serbian Revolution (1804–1817). He was appointed by Karađorđe to command Kačer in 1811.

Life
Loma was born in Gojna Gora, to father Joksim, who after the settling of new inhabitants, immediately after the birth of Arsenije, relocated to Dragolj, in the Rudnik nahija. Arsenije took his nickname Lomo from the river Lovnica (formerly Lomnica), which lies in Gojna Gora. He had a sister, Pauna, who later married Milutin Savić-Garašanin, who together had three sons, one of whom was Ilija Garašanin, the Serbian Prime Minister 1861–1867.

He was one of the initiators of the First Serbian Uprising. He fought under the command of Milan Obrenović at the Battle of Rudnik, in which he showed heroic deeds. At the end of February 1804, at the beginning of the First Serbian Uprising, 500 rebels commanded by Arsenije Loma and Petar Trešnjevčanin besieged Rudnik which was under control of Sali Aga supported by Ali Aga Džavić from Užice and Pljako from Karanovac (modern-day Kraljevo) and their 500 Janissary. He gained the rank of buljubaša in Kačer. He was wounded several times, some of the wounds never healed. In 1811 he was appointed the voivode (top commander) of Kačer by Karađorđe.

The nephew of Aga Tokatlić murdered Loma in revenge.

Today's families of Lomić, Loma, Lomović and Lomigorić are considered his descendants.

Several streets are named after him in Serbia.

See also
 List of Serbian Revolutionaries

References

Miodrag Jaćimović 1972, Arsenije Loma: Vojvda Kačerski i prvi vođa Drugog srpskog ustanka
The memoirs of Prota Matija Nenadović
The first Serbian uprising and the restoration of the Serbian state
Michael Boro Petrovich, A history of modern Serbia, 1804-1918: Volume 1; Volume 1, Harcourt Brace Jovanovich, 1976
Војислав Суботић, Memorijali oslobodilačkih ratova Srbije, Book 1, Volume 1, Vlada Republike Srbije, Ministarstvo rada, zapošljavanja i socijalne politike, 2006

19th-century Serbian nobility
Serbian revolutionaries
People of the First Serbian Uprising
People of the Second Serbian Uprising
Šumadija
1778 births
1815 deaths